is an interchange passenger railway station in the city of Toyooka, Hyōgo Prefecture, Japan, operated jointly by the West Japan Railway Company (JR West) and the private operator Kyoto Tango Railway (Willer Trains Inc.).

Lines
The station is also the western terminus of the Miyazu Line (Miyatoyo Line) and is 83.6 kilometers from the eastern terminus of that line at Nishi-Maizuru.

Station layout
The JR portion of the station consists of one side platform and one island platform connected by an elevated station building. The Kyoto Tango Railway portion of the station has one bay platform. The station is staffed.

Platforms

Adjacent stations

History
Toyooka Station opened on July 10, 1909. With the privatization of the Japan National Railways (JNR) on April 1, 1987, the station came under the aegis of the West Japan Railway Company.

Passenger statistics
In fiscal 2017, the JR portion of the station was used by an average of 1846 passengers daily. During the same period, the Kyoto Tango Railway portion of the station was used by 201 passengers daily.

Surrounding area
 Toyooka Station Shopping Street (Daikai-dori)
 Toyooka City Hall

See also
List of railway stations in Japan

References

External links

  JR West Official Site
  KTR Official Site

Railway stations in Hyōgo Prefecture
Sanin Main Line
Railway stations in Japan opened in 1909
Toyooka, Hyōgo